Charles Delelienne (25 February 1892 – 6 February 1984) was a Belgian field hockey player who competed in the 1920 Summer Olympics. He was the Keeper of the Ling Hockey Club and played in the Belgian National field hockey team, which won the bronze medal.

References

External links
 
Profile
Overview Presidents Belgian Hockey Federation

1892 births
1984 deaths
Belgian male field hockey players
Olympic field hockey players of Belgium
Field hockey players at the 1920 Summer Olympics
Olympic bronze medalists for Belgium
Olympic medalists in field hockey
Medalists at the 1920 Summer Olympics